Danny Ward (born 15 June 1980) is an English professional rugby league coach who was most recently the head coach of the London Broncos in the Betfred Championship, and a former professional rugby league footballer who played in the 1990s, 2000s and 2010s.

He played for the Leeds Rhinos, Castleford Tigers, Hull Kingston Rovers and Harlequins RL in the Super League, and for Great Britain at international level.

Ward was previously Andrew Henderson's assistant coach at the London Broncos, and had held this position since 2015. Prior to this, he was head coach of the Under-19s.

Background
Ward was born in Dewsbury, West Yorkshire, England. Ward is the son of former Leeds captain and coach David Ward.

Playing career

Leeds Rhinos
He was signed for Leeds Rhinos from Dewsbury Moor, and he made his début as a substitute against the Sheffield Eagles in 1999. He was named the Leeds Alliance Player of the Year in 2000, before becoming a regular first team member the following season.

Ward emulated his father by playing in the Challenge Cup Final in 2003. In 2004 he made 14 first team starts and 12 substitute appearances, and scored a try in the 46–28 win over Wakefield.

As Super League IX champions, the Rhinos faced 2004 NRL season premiers, the Canterbury-Bankstown Bulldogs in the 2005 World Club Challenge. In his final season with Leeds, Ward scored a try in the 2005 Challenge Cup Final against Hull and in the Grand Final qualifying win at St. Helens that took the Rhinos back to Old Trafford for the Grand Final. He left Leeds before the 2006 Super League season to join Castleford.

Castleford Tigers
At the beginning of the 2006's Super League XI, Ward was released after an unsavoury incident. He joined the Castleford Tigers, who had just been promoted from National League One. Ward adapted well to his new surroundings and one of his highlights that year was a try in the 31–30 victory over his former employers at the Jungle. However, his efforts were not enough to save Castleford from relegation.

Hull Kingston Rovers
For the 2007 season, he like Luke Dyer, a teammate of his at Castleford, moved east to pastures new at Craven Park with Hull Kingston Rovers. So far, Ward has yet to make the impact that he did at both Leeds and Castleford, but his presence presents a danger to any defence in the whole of Super League.

Harlequins Rugby League

He was released from Hull Kingston Rovers on 17 September 2007. He signed a two-year deal with Harlequins starting from the 2008 season.

International level
Ward first played at international level for the Great Britain Academy before being selected for John Kear's England Under-21 squad for the tour of South Africa at the end of the 2001's Super League VI. England won the first match 112–6, and the second match 74–14. In 2002 he was selected in the England 'A' squad to play New Zealand at Griffin Park, losing 12–34. He then was part of the squad to tour Fiji and Tonga. One of his highlights in 2002 was a drop goal in a victory at the Boulevard on his 21st birthday.

In 2004 Ward made the transition into the senior Great Britain team making his début as a substitute against New Zealand in the Tri Nations competition.

Coaching career

London Broncos
Ward was the head coach of the London Broncos Under-19s for the 2014 and 2015 seasons. He was the assistant coach in 2015 and 2017.

He was promoted to head coach from the beginning of the 2018 season. Ward took charge of his first professional game with a 56–12 victory over the Barrow Raiders.
Danny then, in his first year of being head coach achieved promotion into the super league. Winning 4–2 against the Toronto Wolfpack in the final million pound game.

On 5 Jul 2021 it was reported that he had left the head coach role by mutual respect

References

External links

London Broncos profile
 Quins profile
 Profile at leedsrugby
 Statistics at hullkr.co.uk
 Danny Ward ready to put Hull to the sword

Video
 Ward delighted with Castleford move

1980 births
Living people
Castleford Tigers players
English rugby league coaches
English rugby league players
Great Britain national rugby league team players
London Broncos coaches
London Broncos players
Hull Kingston Rovers players
Leeds Rhinos players
Rugby league players from Dewsbury
Rugby league props